The Dark Overlord may refer to:

 Antagonist in Howard the Duck (film)
 The Dark Overlord (hackers), hacking group